is an action role-playing platform video game developed by Now Production and released by Namco for the Sony PlayStation on December 2, 1999, in Japan. It is the third game in the Dragon Buster series, and features a platform and hack and slash elements.

In the Dragon Valor world, dragons are monsters with immense power; the player's role as a Dragon Valor is to slay them with a magical sword that is passed down through successive generations of the family. In a manner somewhat reminiscent of Phantasy Star III, the game differs from other platform action games of the time in that whom the protagonist marries during the game will influence who will lead the adventure in its next phase. There are two choices in the first chapter, and a possible two choices in the second chapter; hence, the game flow has three potential paths and thus three different endings.

Gameplay
In Dragon Valor, the player's character is placed on a stage, with the intention to get from where they start towards the end of the stage or to defeat specific boss enemies along the way. Ultimately, the player must fight and defeat a dragon at the end of each chapter (a chapter being a series of stages leading towards the dragon) in order to clear the chapter. Along the way, players can collect items to boost their hit points, magic points, attack, and defense. Players can also obtain 'tomes' after defeating specific enemies, which grant access to spells.

The game's currency is Val, and players can collect this to buy recovery potions (which are used immediately upon purchase), status-improving items, or items that may be sold for Val or traded for other items later on in the game. Furthering this topic, the items that the player usually gets in trade are status-improving items.

As stated above, the protagonist changes after clearing each chapter. There are three possible paths, coinciding with the three magic swords that are found on those paths: Azos, Soul, and Kadum. Players generally control a character for one chapter, though some characters can be played twice. The paths, as stated above, are chosen depending on certain triggers in the first chapter. Fulfilling the trigger in Chapter 1, for example, means that Clovis marries Celia and becomes King of Raxis, and the next player character is their son, Arlen. Not fulfilling the trigger means that Clovis instead marries Carolina, which results in the next player character being Kodel. There is a similar choice trigger as Kodel over whether or not to save Fannah in his chapter.

Regardless of the fact that the characters change every chapter, the basic commands remain almost the same, with some slight variations in how they are carried out visually, being the only telltale difference.

Story

Prologue: Dragon Valor
The player begins in the role of Clovis Barclay, a young man living in the land of Jirat. His sister Elena has been killed by a dragon. After a basic tutorial of the moves and how to use the game's magic, Clovis fights and vanquishes the dragon however the same dragon emerges as an alternate form from its corpse. Clovis, in a fit of rage, swears vengeance and that he will find and kill this dragon.

Chapter 1: Avenger
(Clovis does not belong specifically to any path, but he can set the choice as to whether the player embarks on the Azos, Soul, or Kadum paths)

Having tracked the fugitive dragon for 5 years, Clovis arrives in the kingdom of Raxis, where he engages in combat with bandits. After the brawl, Clovis is introduced to Carolina, an inventor who was shopping for parts when the bandits attacked, and she informs Clovis of the background:

The Azale Knights are a military force of Jirat led by Volef, the Black Knight. They had turned rogue, attacked Raxis Castle, home of the royal family and taken Princess Celia hostage. Also siding with Volef is Raimun, an alchemist and samurai; both had received their powers from a mysterious source which turns out to be the dragon pursued by Clovis.

After some gameplaying stages, the player may choose to rescue Princess Celia or not, which will determine both the protagonist and the subsequent story of the next chapter. Having made the decision, the player (as Clovis) duels Volef, who runs off when beaten and heads for the alchemist's tower (where Raimun resides). After killing Raimun, Clovis' magic sword reveals that the dragon is hidden west, deep within the catacombs.

Clovis now faces a revived Volef, who now uses lightning based magic. Again, Volef runs away in defeat, only to lead Clovis to the dragon, who considers Volef's usefulness to be at an end and burns him to death just as Clovis arrives. Once the dragon is dead, Clovis realises that his vengeance has left him with nothing to do.

If Princess Celia has been rescued earlier, the following chapter focuses on Arlen Barclay, heir to the throne of Raxis, otherwise it focuses on Kodel Barclay, who makes a living stealing from pirates. These characters have slight variations in fighting style.

Chapter 2: Kodel
(Playing as Kodel occurs if Princess Celia was not rescued in Chapter 1. Kodel is playable on both the Azos and Kadum paths, as choosing whether or not to rescue Fannah determines whether you play as Phillip or Gerome in Chapter 3)

Time passes after the events of Chapter 1, where Clovis leaves for Kadeli with Carolina. They settle down, but Clovis leaves without word one day. Carolina continues waiting for him, while Kodel, partly to support his mother, and partly out of frustration, earns his living stealing from pirates. Eventually, he steals from the pirate Robere, who is holding the sword Azos, which belonged to Clovis. As such, Kodel takes the weapon as his own, and rescues Fannah, who is actually the daughter of Robere.

Fleeing the ship after the knights attack Robere's pirates, Kodel and Fannah swim for Kadeli, and while in the city, are attacked by a knight, who bears a message for Robere from Clovis. This message comes by a ghost appearing from the knight's corpse and taking Fannah's soul from her body. This leads to a fight between Kodel and Robere, after which Robere explains to Kodel that Clovis left the sword in his care. One day, Clovis would send a sign to Robere that he needs to be stopped, and that sign would be the theft of his greatest treasure.

Kodel refuses to give Azos to Robere, deciding to face his father and to go and rescue Fannah. Eventually arriving at the abandoned fortress near the destroyed city of Linton, Kodel searches the fort for his father. (Here, the option is presented about saving Fannah or not. Saving Fannah makes Phillip the main character for the next chapter, while not saving her makes Gerome the main character.) Kodel finds Clovis, and they duel. After Kodel wins the fight, Clovis explains that there was evil growing in his heart, and that is why he left, in addition to trying to contain a dragon currently residing within the volcano near Linton. Kodel swears to his father that he will defeat the dragon, however then his father is to return home with him.

Kodel journeys to the Volcano, and faces a two-headed dragon. Eventually besting it, he returns to Clovis' fortress, to find Robere and Fannah also waiting for him there. Depending on whether or not Kodel released Fannah's soul from the room it was imprisoned in, the ending will differ, between Fannah falling in love with or hating Kodel. Clovis returns to Carolina, and, again depending on whether Fannah's soul was freed or not, Kodel either settles down with her or travels. This leads to Chapter 3.

Soul Path

Chapter 2: Arlen
(Playing as Arlen occurs if Princess Celia was rescued in Chapter 1.)

We learn that Clovis found peace with Celia and his wounded heart was soothed. Later, the Kingdom of Raxis split into two factions, the East, which was ruled by the royal family, and the West, retitled Alkemia, led by Lodonya, Volef's son, and commander of the Azale Knights. However, the West Raxis Liberation Army, a resistance movement to Lodonya's rule, wishes to reunite Raxis into one Kingdom.

The whole dispute started because Celia married Clovis, a commoner. After the split between East and West, Lodonya turned up and took control of the West. Lodonya's despise of the Raxis royal family comes from the fact that he holds Clovis, who has died before the independent kingdom of Alkemia was founded, responsible for the death of his father, Volef. After his encounter with Lodonya, Arlen is knocked off the battlements of the East Raxis castle while trying to rescue his mother, Celia.

Arlen is swept downstream to the Falayd Caverns, where he is found (knocked out) by Shalya, the leader of the West Raxis Liberation Army, and her two lieutenants, Simon and Franco. After Arlen recovers, he leaves, headed towards Alkemia, being the unwitting decoy for Shalya's forces as he decimates the Alkemian garrison, and fights through the guards at the execution grounds where Queen Cilia is being held prisoner in anticipation of her execution. While Arlen is doing that, Shalya rescues the queen. After being berated by his mother for time-wasting (and a slight bit of possible confusion as to whether or not he wasted time, courtesy of Shalya), Arlen then learns of Lodonya's true intent: to revive the dragon. Moving onwards to the glacier, Arlen eventually faces Lodonya and bests him. Lodonya flees to the Dragon's cavern, where he asks the dragon to consume his soul, that their powers might be joined in defeating Arlen. The dragon complies, but Arlen prevails.

With the fact that Lodonya's body was never recovered, the civil war in Raxis came to an end. Realizing that the dispute causing the war came in part from his father being a commoner, Arlen married Shalya, also a commoner, to permanently end the dispute. In time, they had a son, whom they named Felippe.

Chapter 3: Felippe

Felippe is the son of Arlen and Shalya, the king and queen of Raxis. Having had warriors for parents, Felippe quickly learned their skills. He wanted to journey and have an adventure, so he disguised himself and entered a martial arts tournament in the neighbouring kingdom of Jirat, which he won. This led to an exhibition match between Vilherm, one of Jirat's strongest knights and the protector to Jeanne, the princess, and Felippe, with Jeanne and the prime minister, Zomas, watching.

Partway through the duel, Zomas takes Jeanne hostage, demanding the sword Azos, which Felippe is currently using, in exchange for her life. Felippe surrenders the sword, which Zomas takes with him as he flees back to his estate. As Felippe borrows Vilherm's sword to hunt down Zomas and recover his own, Zomas presents Azos to Krassel, who promised to give Zomas the power of a dragon halfling in exchange for it. Krassel, after finishing this, encounters Felippe while the latter is searching the Zomas estate for Azos. Vilherm's blade is chipped as Felippe strikes Krassel, and seeing that he cannot defeat the dragon halfling without a magic sword, flees.

Felippe learns of a magic sword being sealed in the ruins near Jirat, and journeys there, defeating the guardian to claim the magic sword, Soul. On his journey back, he encounters Jeanne, who reveals that Zomas has led a coup against the kingdom, and seeks the sword herself that she may save her people and repay the sacrifices made to ensure her escape. She confesses her feelings of inadequacy, despite her being a skilled swordswoman. Felippe consoles her, saying that she was facing demons, and he discloses his identity to her.

The two reach an agreement, as Felippe cannot surrender Soul to Jeanne, that he will, while searching for Azos, liberate the Jirat castle. He encounters and faces Zomas, who has become mentally deranged by the transfusion of dragon cells into his body. Upon Felippe defeating him, Zomas flees to his estate. Felippe does a more thorough search, and faces Zomas again, whose body transforms into that of a monster. After defeating Zomas, who is left unable to move or speak by the transformation, Felippe searches for the sword. Krassel appears, revealing that he double-crossed Zomas, knowing that the latter would only turn into a monster by the process, and then kills him.

Felippe confronts Krassel on the rooftop of the Zomas estate, where Krassel reveals his identity and calls a dragon to take Felippe out, that he might also claim Soul in addition to Azos. Felippe prevails against the dragon, however, and Krassel flees with Azos. Felippe is hailed as a hero, although regretting the loss of Azos. He and Jeanne marry, and the kingdoms of Jirat and Raxis are unified by their wedding into the Empire of Jirat. They have twin children, Anna and Mihael.

Chapter 4: Anna

The chapter opens with Anna journeying to Saldo in search of a magic sword, accompanied by a now elderly Vilherm. Vilherm instructs her to wait at the entrance to the ruins, until concern creeps in and she goes looking for him out of worry. Journeying through to the deepest part of the ruins, Anna finds Vilherm battered and wounded, but alive. Halfas then attempts to attack, but is thwarted. Halfas feels he has finally found a worthy opponent, and as such decides to "Strengthen" Anna, attempting to kill her. Vilherm sacrifices himself to save her life. This sacrifice arouses hatred for Halfas within Anna, as she swears to attain vengeance by killing Halfas.

Before Halfas departs, he leaves to Anna the information that he will be awaiting her arrival in Verea, and offers a chance to claim the other two magic swords.

Anna journeys to and then through Verea into the lair of the Demons. On her way to facing Halfas, she encounters and defeats Vappula, who then flees. Upon her arrival where Krassel is waiting, she arrives to find Vappula dead, killed by Krassel. Krassel says that she actually killed Vappula, and says so to Vappula's face before he is killed. Anna then defeats Krassel and goes in search of Halfas.

Halfas, meanwhile, is waiting. He mockingly offers to fully heal Anna, who counters by saying his confidence will be his undoing. Anna defeats Halfas, who awaits the deathblow, saying that only all three swords combined will kill him. Krassel appears, however, before she can deliver it, taking Azos and Kadum with him as he flees. Anna rushes off in pursuit, ignoring Halfas' pleas for death. Anna then faces and defeats the dragon Talon (believing it to be Krassel), and lowers her guard as she plants Soul in the ground under the belief that the fighting is over.

Krassel then steals Soul, and by uniting the power of the three swords, is able to call directly upon the magical powers of Dahaka. He sets off a violent explosion, and Anna disappears. With no word heard of her, Mihael organizes the Azale Knights and heads off in search of his sister, praying and hoping that she still lives.

Chapter 5: Mihael

Having lost contact with Anna, Mihael organizes the Azale Knights and sets off in search of Anna. Along the way, he is separated from the Azale Knights and continues on alone, to the now fallen Kingdom of Raxis. Fighting through the ruins of Raxis City and then its now-dilapidated castle, Mihael finds some renewed hope upon seeing a wounded Anna within the dungeon of Raxis Castle. Upon their reunion, Anna assures Mihael that she will be alright, but that a dragon has stolen the swords, and that Mihael is the only one who can reclaim them. Taking heart at this, Mihael heads further towards the site where Clovis defeated the dragon Titan. A passage to the underworld now stands here, and Mihael ventures through it, hoping to reclaim the swords and thus be able to ensure Anna's safety.

Upon entering the underworld, Mihael finds the guardian of the sword Igunis standing before him. Igunis goes on to reveal the origin of dragons, along with the origins of the magic swords. During this, Igunis reveals that Mihael, along with Anna, are  descendants of the gods, and thus stand the best chance of defeating Dahaka. Upon completion, Igunis entrusts itself to Mihael. Mihael then ventures deeper into the underworld, encountering and defeating Krassel. As Krassel lays dying, Mihael rushes off to stop Dahaka. He arrives too late, as Dahaka is released, along with eons' worth of evil. Dahaka then begins toying with Mihael, trying to manipulate his emotions to foster rage, to turn him into a dragon. Mihael almost gives in, when Anna's voice breaks in on his thoughts. Her words snap him back to reality, upon which he and Dahaka fight. Upon gaining an upper hand, Dahaka absorbs a lot of the evil that is lingering, and fights with renewed vigor.

Mihael eventually prevails, and then uses Igunis to seal the gates of Gehenna forever. Dahaka is sealed away, but his final words linger: as long as evil exists, Dahaka will one day return. Mihael leaves the underworld, heading towards Raxis Castle. En route, a red crystal appears before him; Anna is inside. Upon it reaching him, the crystal shatters, releasing an unconscious Anna into Mihael's arms.

Mihael gives Anna a piggy-back ride, which she initially complains to. Mihael refuses to let her down, after seeing how injured she had been before. The two speculate more on their ancestry, as revealed by Igunis. Together the come to the theory that it was the divine blood in their veins that helped them find each other, that formed the crystal Anna was within, and that allowed her voice to reach him when he needed it most. Giving up on speculation, Anna gently 'spurs' Mihael, to make him go faster. Mihael tells her to hold on, and breaks into a run. Laughing, the two head off towards home.

Kadum Path

Chapter 3: Phillip

Kodel and Fannah settle down as sailors before Phillip is born. Due to Fannah's good head for business, her company flourishes, and eventually, Phillip also becomes a sailor, taking Azos with him. During a voyage, the ship he is on is attacked by beasts, and the dragon halfling Vappula reveals himself. Vappula knocks Phillip overboard, then flies in search of a different magic sword. Phillip is washed ashore on the island of Paley, where he meets Jeanne and Vilherm. Jeanne keeps her identity a secret for now, merely telling Phillip the way to the village.

Phillip travels the way Jeanne suggested, planning to either wait for a ship back to Kadeli, for his captain to find him, or else to settle down in the village. The village is attacked, however, by Vappula's forces. Phillip then journeys to the ruins where he was told a magic sword resides. On the way, however, he encounters Vappula, who is searching for the same thing. Vappula unleashes the dragon accompanying him to attack Phillip, in the hopes of claiming Azos. Phillip manages to defeat the dragon, and Vappula subsequently flees.

Phillip then arrives at the Paley ruins, where he encounters, then defeats the guardian, thus acquiring the sword Kadum. As he exits the ruins, he finds the captain of his ship, Vilherm, and Jeanne waiting at the entrance for him. Jeanne asks to borrow one of the swords, but cannot, as Phillip has been chosen by both Azos and Kadum. Phillip, however, helps Jeanne end the strife in her kingdom that was caused by demons, and the two eventually marry.

Vappula, meanwhile, meets with his fellow minions, Halfas and Krassel. Both are displeased that he lost to a Dragon Valor, stating that his brawn was his only redeeming feature. As such, Vappula is executed by Halfas.

As time passes, the sword Azos is stolen, and Mihael and Anna are born.

Chapter 4: Mihael

The chapter opens with Mihael journeying to Saldo in search of a magic sword, accompanied by a now elderly Vilherm. Vilherm instructs Mihael to wait at the entrance to the ruins. He complies, noting that he's happy Anna didn't come because she had a date with a prince to worry about, until waiting grows thin. Journeying through to the deepest part of the ruins, Mihael finds Vilherm battered and wounded, but alive. Halfas then attempts to attack, but is thwarted. Halfas feels he has finally found a worthy opponent, and as such decides to "Strengthen" Mihael, attempting to kill him. Vilherm sacrifices himself to save Miahel's life. This sacrifice arouses hatred for Halfas within Mihael, who then swears that he will kill Halfas and avenge Vilherm.

Before Halfas departs, he leaves to Mihael the information that he will be awaiting his arrival in Verea, and offers a chance to claim the other two magic swords.

Mihael journeys to Verea, fighting through the city. It is here that he encounters Grusamseus, who plans to gain Dahaka's power and thus become a dragon halfling. Besting Grusamseus, Mihael rushes onward, to pass through and eventually reach the lair of the Demons. Facing and defeating Krassel, he then searches for Halfas. Halfas mockingly offers for Mihael to be fully healed before they fight, but Mihael counters, claiming that Halfas' confidence will be his downfall. Halfas is bested, and waiting for the finishing blow. Mihael intends to end Halfas' life, but Krassel steals the swords Soul and Azos, thus preventing Mihael from doing so. Mihael then faces the dragon Talon, defeats it, and lowers his guard by planting Kadum in the ground.

Krassel then steals Kadum, and by uniting the power of the three swords, is able to call directly upon the magical powers of Dahaka. He sets off a violent explosion, and Mihael disappears. With no word heard of him, Anna eventually sets out to find her brother, believing and praying that he is still alive.

Chapter 5: Anna

Having lost contact with Mihael, Anna goes searching in the fallen Kingdom of Raxis. Fighting her way through the ruined Raxis City, then the dilapidated castle, she manages to find a wounded Mihael, who explains about the theft of the swords by Krassel. He exhorts Anna to go and stop Krassel's plans: to revive Dahaka and unleash him upon the world. Anna agrees to this, and heads off towards where Clovis defeated the dragon Titan. Awaiting her there is the path to the underworld.

Anna ventures through the passage, eventually coming out in the Underworld to come face to face with the guardian for the sword, Igunis. Igunis has been waiting for her, as it begins its revelation upon the origins of dragons, and how the gods sought to fight them. Eventually, the magic swords were made by the forbidden arts. After the war, Igunis was created against the worst-case scenario. After its revelations, which include that Anna, and her brother Mihael, are descendants of the gods, Igunis entrusts itself to Anna. Taking up Igunis, Anna sets off to find Krassel.

When she eventually reaches him, it is almost too late. Dahaka is almost revived. In a last-ditch effort to stop the attempted resurrection, Anna charges into battle with Krassel, defeating him. As Krassel lays dying, Anna rushes off to stop the revival. She arrives too late, as Dahaka is unleashed on the world, with ages of stored evil coming forth to herald the resurrection.

Dahaka returns to torment Anna, trying to foster her rage so that he can coerce her to give into it and become a dragon. She almost gives in, but Mihael's voice resounds in her mind, telling her the words she needs most to release her anger: that he is alright, and by her side in this fight; that she is not alone. Anna rushes forward to attack Dahaka, and manages to get the upper hand. Dahaka, upon being bested, absorbs the evil and malice in the air around them, and uses that to magnify his power. Anna then fights a more desperate fight, eventually defeating the ancient dragon. As Dahaka lies there, Anna uses Igunis as the key to seal the gates of Gehenna forever.

As Dahaka is returned behind the seal, he leaves a final warning: as long as evil exists, he will once again return. Anna decides to return home with Mihael, while pondering this information and speculating how best to prevent Dahaka's return.  As she is lovingly helping her brother limp home, a visibly embarrassed Mihael tells his sister that he can still manage to walk by himself and she doesn't need to support his weight. Anna just continues to do so anyway, affectionately reassuring him that since they're in a foreign country, nobody would know that they're related as the Prince and Princess (which some fans have interpreted as an implication of possible incest between twins, considering the intense level of intimacy between the pair; while other fans have interpreted it as merely just the personal freedom of the siblings to express their familial bonds sans expected formalities), despite Mihael's embarrassment.

Azos Path

Chapter 3: Gerome

During Kodel's travels, he encounters a young thief, whose name is Gerome. Kodel takes Gerome under his wing and begins teaching him swordsmanship. Gerome eventually surpasses Kodel's skill, and the two have a foster relationship of father and son. Kodel, however, catches a virulent disease and dies. After his death, Gerome again turns to thievery, stealing from thieves and others. Eventually, he is attacked by a mob of thieves, whom he overcomes and steals from. Among the things stolen is a map of the cathedral of the Dahaka cult. Gerome resolves to take the cult's treasure as his own.

Journeying to where the cathedral is located in Saldo, Gerome encounters the dragon halfling Halfas, whom he refuses to fight. Once in the Cathedral, Gerome enters the crypt, and eventually meets Sarah, the last survivor of the village of magicians, who is chained up as a sacrifice to the dragon the cult has revived using the Wisdom Stones stolen from her village. (Gerome can either release her or scare her, theoretically they lead to the same result.) After learning this, Gerome journeys further into the crypt, eventually reaching the last of the ruins, where the dragon resides. He defeats the dragon, only to find no Wisdom Stones.

Sarah reappears, telling him that the dragon's bones are now Wisdom Stones, too, and that, should they be processed, could be sold as such for quite a lot of money. Halfas appears, seeking another fight, but Sarah drives him away with her magic. Gerome offers a partnership to Sarah, who has nowhere else to go, and they sell the Wisdom Stones they make from the dragon's bones for a hefty profit, and eventually they marry. They give birth to a daughter, whom they name Anita.

Chapter 4: Anita

Anita, Gerome's daughter, becomes an exorcist. With the magical power she inherited from her mother, Sarah, along with Gerome's skills as a swordsman and Dragon Valor, she quickly rises to be considered the best in her field. The kingdoms neighbouring the fallen Kingdom of Raxis petition her to go to Raxis castle and slay the demons there. She accepts the contract, chasing the demons to the Sorcerer's Keep on the Raxis-Jirat border. Upon clearing the keep, she finds a lithograph, containing information on the three magic swords.

Deciding that if she had all three swords, she would be unstoppable, Anita sets off in search of Soul and Kadum. She begins her search in Jirat, where she is intercepted by an elderly VIlherm and a Jirat soldier accompanying him. Vilherm insists she forget her quest and surrender Azos. Anita refuses, fighting and besting him. Vilherm then reveals why Jirat wants to confiscate the magic swords: they are the keys to Pandora's Box, and all three cannot be allowed to fall into the hands of one person all at once. The Kingdom of Raxis was destroyed by the efforts of Queen Celia, 50 years ago, to open Pandora's Box using Soul, Kadum, and a third sword she attempted to create herself.

Anita ignores Vilherm's warning, warning him in return that if he or any other Jirat soldier got in her way, that she would kill them, without hesitation. Upon fighting her way through the Jirat ruins, where she believes one of the swords is kept, she finds the guardian already defeated. She then surmises that somebody was already there. Halfas appears, praising her skills as a Dragon Valor. She denies them, stating she is an exorcist, and that is how she detected him. Halfas countermands it, stating that her power is still too weak, but that she has the potential to become a worthy opponent. He then curses her, informing her that she has a month in which time, she must kill him, else she will die. He then leaves, after disclosing that he may be found, along with Soul and Kadum, at Mount Verea.

Anita, desperate to save her life and seething with hatred, heads for Verea, seeking to kill Halfas and thus prevent her own death. On her way, she encounters and defeats both Vappula and Krassel, with her encounters with both beginning in a similar manner to how they began in Anna's story. Anita then goes in search of Halfas, and finds him.

Halfas, this time, stands and fights, eventually losing to Anita's skill. She prepares to kill him, as he requests, by using all three swords, but Krassel intervenes and takes Kadum and Soul. Anita goes in pursuit, believing Halfas that she needs to use all three swords together to kill him and break the curse. Anita then faces and beats the dragon, and plants Azos in the ground as she lowers her guard, believing everything is over.

Krassel then Steals Azos, and by uniting the power of the three swords, is able to directly call upon the magical powers of Dahaka. He sets off a violent explosion, and Anita disappears. After not hearing from her in some time, Gerome and Sarah go in search of their daughter. Gerome, following a rumor, heads towards Raxis castle, where a girl matching Anita's description was apparently spotted.

Chapter 5: Gerome/Anita

Note: Gerome is the only playable character to appear from a previous generation, and remains playable for the first two stages. Afterwards, play reverts to Anita.

Gerome
Following the rumor, Gerome arrives in Raxis city, and begins to search for his daughter, besting demons along the way. Eventually clearing through Raxis City and the ruins of Raxis Castle, Gerome is reunited with Anita. Anita then explains to her father that she has been cursed, and must find the means to remove the curse that Halfas placed upon her. In addition, she refuses to let Gerome take over, as she has her pride to consider. Gerome, somewhat sarcastic about her pride, permits her to continue on.

Anita
Anita, after receiving her father's blessing, heads towards the old Raxis catacombs, which are now a portal to the underworld thanks to Krassel's use of Azos, Soul, and Kadum to break the seal of Gehenna. Journeying through the Underworld Entrance, she encounters an animated suit of armor, the guardian of Igunis, the fourth, and strongest, magic sword. Igunis then tells Anita the reason for its existence: it was created from a god, whereas the other three blades, Azos, Soul, and Kadum, were created from angels to end the war between Gods and Dragons that was destroying the world. While the war ended, the dragons survived by changing their shape, to become the evil in human hearts. This evil would then physically manifest by turning such humans into dragons or dragon halflings. With the fact that the sword's guardian feels free, in spite of the seals placed upon it, it reveals that the gates to Gehenna have been opened, and that Dahaka will be revived and unleashed on the world.

Taking Igunis in hand, Anita sets out through the demonic underworld, eventually making it to where Krassel is waiting. Using the power of Igunis, Anita defeats and kills Krassel. Before Krassel dies, however, Anita rushes off to try to prevent the revival of Dahaka. She fails, and Dahaka comes back after his initial flight, trying to turn this would-be Dragon Valor into a dragon. Anita nearly falls to this, but with some assistance from Gerome, manages to stand firm. Eventually, Anita fights Dahaka and defeats him, then using Igunis to seal the gates of Gehenna forever, and with them, Dahaka. Dahaka mentions that as long as evil exists, he will. This leaves Anita troubled.

As Anita begins the trek back home to Saldo, she find Gerome's body, encased in a crystal of blood. Upon her approaching it, the Crystal shatters, and Gerome stands up to greet his exhausted daughter. Then, as he carries her in a piggyback fashion, he talks with her. Anita asks why it is that humans haven't turned into dragons, considering that there is evil in human hearts. Gerome points out that she did not, and then asks if she loves him, to which a puzzled Anita replies that she does. Gerome then theorizes that as long as there is love in the human heart, humans will never turn into dragons. Seeing a town up ahead, Gerome runs off, still carrying Anita in a piggyback fashion.

Main characters
Clovis Barclay is a youth who swears to avenge the death of his sister Elena, a victim of the battle between himself and the Dragons. Although he devotes himself to the pursuit of vengeance, he is good-hearted. He manages to defeat Volef (twice), chief of the Azale Knights and Raimun, the Alchemist when Clovis reaches Raxis Castle. He also defeated two dragons. The first being Rage in the Prologue chapter and Titan in the first chapter. He was the first person to possess the magic sword, Azos. After he defeats Titan, he is disappointed that he has nothing else to achieve. Clovis also appears in the second chapter, where he leaves Carolina and their son, Kodel, who finds him at his abandoned fortress in Linton City. Clovis is defeated by Kodel but explains his reasons on why he had left them for so long. He returns home with Kodel in the end and Carolina greets him as if nothing had happened. In Chapter one, it is also possible for Clovis to rescue Celia, and he marries her to become King of Raxis after defeating Titan. This leads to the Soul Path, and Clovis fathers Arlen, dying sometime between the end of the first and start of the second chapters. (Clovis is one of the two characters who can be used twice in the same playthrough, being used as the player character in the Prologue and Chapter 1.)
Carolina is a fledgling inventor, whom Clovis saves from demons at the border of Raxis. She falls in love with Clovis when he avenges the death of her father and later comes to share his life. Eventually, in the land of Kadeli, she follows her father's footsteps and, like him, becomes an inventor. Despite Clovis leaving her and their son, she patiently awaited his return. Though Kodel mentions to Clovis that she was getting tired of waiting and that he was coming home.
Celia of Raxis is the Princess of the Kingdom of Raxis. She was held prisoner by the Azale Knights who killed her parents, the King and Queen of Raxis. Clovis rescues her, and is then invited to join the Raxis Knights. Over time the destinies of the two become entwined. Soon Clovis, the king of Raxis dies young leaving Celia behind with their son, Arlen. She was kidnapped by Londonya, the son of Volef and leader of the dark Alkemia Knights in West Raxis. She was set to be executed in ten days but Shalya rescues her due to using Arlen as a decoy. Once rescued, Celia informs Arlen that Lodonya has revived the dragon with the intent to use it to force Raxis to submit to the nation of Alkemia. (Celia is also referenced in Anita's story for having attempted to use the power of the magic swords in a manner similar to how Krassel actually begins Dahaka's revival, but because she tried to fake Azos, the ritual went wrong, decimating her kingdom.)
Arlen of Raxis, son of Queen Celia and King Clovis, although born Prince of Raxis, young Arlen is forced to fight as a knight due to the fragmentation of the kingdom. Londonya kidnaps his mother and he is thrown off from the balcony of the East Raxis palace. But he is then saved by three people, Shalya, the leader of the West Raxis Liberation Army, Franco and Simon. Though he was unaware that the three knew his identity, they too were also trying to unite East and West Raxis. Arlen also battles Londonya as well as the ice dragon, Arktos, both battles in which he succeeds in. In the end, he becomes the new king of Raxis with Shalya as his queen.
Kodel Barclay, son of Carolina and Clovis, supports his family by using the swordsmanship he learned from his now-disappeared father. He has a rough-hewn personality. He continues the second series of the game and meets a young pirate girl name Fannah. They eventually escape from Robert's pirate ship and end up in Kadeli City. When Fannah's soul is taken from a ghost, Robert immediately blames Kodel for harming his daughter and battles with him, which he loses, though at the abandoned fortress in Linton City, Kodel manages to find Fannah's soul. Afterwards, Kodel battles twin dragons, Hellfire and Inferno, and succeeds in slaying them. Kodel then returns to the abandoned fortress where Robert, Clovis and Fannah (Who announces that she is in love with him) await his return. In the end, Kodel is married to Fannah, making his and his family's impoverished life into one of wealth. Should Kodel fail to rescue Fannah, Clovis will release her freely; however, any emotions she had for him are lost. Afterwards, Kodel keeps to the life of a traveler, eventually finding and adopting Gerome as his son. After teaching Gerome swordsmanship, Kodel dies due to a disease.
Phillip Barclay is the son of Kodel and Fannah. As well as being as a swordsman like his father, he was also a sailor. One day, onboard on the family's ship he was attacked by demons and was knocked off from the ship by a tubby dragon name Vappula (Though Phillip does not know Vappula's name at this time). He wakes up on the shores on the South-Eastern side of Paley Island and meets Jeanne and Vilherm, both whom he suspects are from royalty. As Phillip travels along the forests of Paley Island, he comes across a village and meets the chief, Maseo, who tells him about the magic sword, Kadum, which is hidden in the ruins. Phillip encounters Vappula again as well as the dragon, Thunder. He successfully slays it and tries to battle Vappula, who escapes in the glowing light. Phillip then makes his way to the ruins and obtains the magic sword, Kadum. There he meets up with the Captain of his ship, Calvin, Vilherm and Jeanne. Jeanne is surprised to see that he had managed to get hold of the sword and asks him if she could have it, but Phillip tells her that not everyone can wield the magic sword. They all meet up privately on the Jirat ship where Jeanne reveals that she is the Imperial Princess of Jirat and requests for Phillip to destroy the dragon that preys upon her country. On asking about the reward for the task, Phillip asks for Princess Jeanne, which she accepts. After defeating the remaining demons in Jirat, Phillip and Jeanne are married, making them both as the Emperor and Empress of Jirat. He was the first Dragon Valor to possess two magic swords.
Felippe Barclay is the son of King Arlen and Queen Shalya. He was known as the best swordsman in Raxis. He had entered in a tournament in Jirat castle and challenged their best knight, Vilherm, but things went horribly wrong as the Minister Zomas grabbed Jeanne and threatened to break her neck, if Vilherm did not get the magic sword, Azos from Felippe. Felippe does sacrifice the sword to save her but manages to obtain another magic sword, Soul. He does however fail to retrieve Azos from Krassel in the end. He too is also married to Princess Jeanne.
Princess Jeanne of Jirat is the heiress to the throne of the empire of Jirat. Depending on whether the player is Phillip or Felippe, her backstory, intent, and the events she partakes in differ. As Phillip, the player encounters Jeanne searching for a magic sword so she can use it to drive out the dragon plaguing her country. As Felippe, she is watching an exhibition match between Felippe and Jirat's finest knight, Vilherm. After being held hostage by Zomas, she seeks a magic sword in order to restore her family's honor and defeat Zomas, who has staged a coup. Jeanne will fall in love with and marry either Phillip or Felippe (depending on who the player controls) and elevate them to being Emperor of Jirat, while she becomes Empress.
Gerome Barclay is a young thief, whom Kodel saves from death. He was taught by him swordsmanship and surpassed him in ability. Kodel had supposedly adopted him. After Kodel passes away from a virulent disease, he becomes uninterested in companionship but eventually stirs up his skills as a thief once again. In the Forest of Mist, he is confronted by Halfas but quickly escapes as he does not wish to face him. He then encounters Dahaka's cult, but is only after the hidden treasure. In the Cathedral Crypt, he finds Sarah, a Magician from the Forest of Mist, chained onto a stone table as a sacrifice to the dragon and eventually sets her free. They meet up again after Gerome defeats the dragon, Hades and Halfas confronts Gerome again but is saved when Sarah sets him on fire. Gerome recovers the wisdom stones and sells them to buy a home in Saldo where he settles into a peaceful life with Sarah as exorcists.
Mihael Barclay is the Imperial Prince of Jirat, son to Emperor Phillip and Empress Jeanne (also son to Emperor Felippe, in the other storyline). He traveled to Saldo with Vilherm after the magic sword, Azos was stolen. However, on their search for the sword, Vilherm is killed by Halfas and Michael travels to Mount Verea, determined to avenge Vilherm. On the way, he battles with Grusamseus, who intends on transforming into a dragon halfing by gaining Dahaka's power. He defeats him and Grusamseus lets him go, though he only appears once on the game. In the Demon's Lair, Mihael battles both Krassel and Halfas as well as the dragon, Talon whom Mihael had thought it to be Krassel. The magic sword, Kadum is then swiped from him and is joined by the other two magic swords Krassel had taken. Krassel tends to get rid of Mihael but he disappears in the blast. (In the alternate storyline, he goes in search of his sister, Anna, in the fallen Kingdom of Raxis. Mihael fights through to the underworld, obtains Igunis, and defeats Krassel, then Dahaka. Mihael and Anna are then reunited and the two travel for home.)
Anna Barclay is the Imperial Princess of Jirat, daughter to Emperor Phillip and Empress Jeanne (also daughter to Emperor Felippe, in the other storyline). Anna searches for Mihael in the ruins of Raxis and is happy to see that he is still alive, but shocked to hear that Vilherm had been murdered while trying to save him. Mihael intends to go on but Anna tells him to rest while she continues this dangerous journey. In the Passage to the Underworld, Anna meets the guardian, Igunis, who presents her the magic sword, Igunis to stop Dahaka. As she survives crossing her way through the demon world, Anna encounters Krassel, who tells her that she is too late as he had already revived Dahaka, though he is slain for good. Before the final battle, Dahaka darkly encourages her to shapeshift into a dragoness but she is saved by the familiar voice of Mihael. Finally Dahaka is defeated and Anna seals the gates of Gehenna with the sword, Igunis. Back in the human world, Anna and Mihael safely return home. (In the alternate storyline, Anna goes with Vilherm to Saldo in search of the sword Azoz. After swearing vengeance on Halfas for his killing Vilherm, she fights through Verea, defeats Vappula, Krassel, and Halfas before facing the dragon Talon. Her disappearance sparks Mihael to go in search of her.)
Anita Barclay is the daughter of the thief, Gerome and magician, Sarah. With skills as a swordswoman from her father and magic from her mother, she becomes an exorcist. After an exorcism of a tower in Raxis, she learns about the existence of the other two magic swords, and goes in search of them. After finding them, she encounters Halfas, who places a death curse upon her. Using every method she knows as an exorcist, she delays the curse in order to hunt down and kill Halfas. After defeating Krassel and Halfas, she fights the dragon Talon, and disappears after Krassel obtains the three swords. When Gerome finds her, she resumes her quest to break the curse upon her. By defeating Dahaka, she succeeds.

Weapons
Azos, known as the Angel of Fire, is one of the magic swords that are used by the characters in the game, and the one that sees the most use. Initially wielded by Clovis, Azos is also wielded by Arlen, Kodel, Phillip, Gerome, and Anita. In the Soul and Kadum paths, Azos is stolen by the Cult of Dahaka. Azos also makes appearances in Chapters 4 and 5 on the Soul and Kadum paths as a plot device.
Soul, known as the Angel of Light, is one of the magic swords that are used by the characters in the game. Soul is used by Felippe and Anna on the Soul Path. Soul also makes appearances in Chapters 4 and 5 on the Azos and Kadum paths as a plot device.
Kadum, known as the Angel of Thunder, is one of the magic swords that are used by the characters in the game. Kadum sees the least use and appears the least in the game, being used only by Mihael on the Kadum path, and seen in Chapters 4 and 5 of the Azos and Soul paths as a plot device.
Igunis, known as the Divine Destroyer, is one of the magic swords that are used by the characters in the game. Regardless of the paths, Igunis is obtained for use in Chapter 5, and is used by either Mihael, Anna, or Anita. Before being obtained, Igunis reveals that Azos, Soul, and Kadum were all angels once who volunteered to be transformed by the forbidden arts of the gods into magic swords that could defeat the dragons. Igunis also volunteered to be transformed after the war between the gods and the dragons was ended. It is implied in this that the reason Igunis volunteered was to safeguard against the reappearance of Dahaka.

Antagonists
Halfas is one of the three dragon halflings who are in the Cult of Dahaka. Halfas has something akin to a sense of honour, in that he offers a challenge to the character the player controls in Chapter 4 (either Mihael, Anna, or Anita). This challenge is to try to strengthen them with emotions like hatred, bloodlust, and vengeance, in order to metamorphose into dragons themselves. His plans are foiled, and he does not obtain the death he seeks at their hands. He is a boss in Chapter 4, regardless of whether the player is Mihael, Anna, or Anita. Defeating him leads to the battle against the dragon Talon.
Vappula is one of the three dragon halflings who are in the Cult of Dahaka. In Phillip's storyline, Phillip confronts Vappula in Chapter 3 and manages to defeat his dragon, thus claiming Kadum. Vappula escapes and runs to Krassel and Halfas. Krassel executes him after a short conversation. In the Felippe and Gerome storylines, however, Vappula does not make an appearance. He appears as a boss in Chapter 4 as either Anna or Anita.
Krassel is one of the three dragon halflings who are in the Cult of Dahaka. In Felippe's storyline, Krassel manipulates the Jirat prime minister, Zomas, eventually metamorphosising him into a monster in order to steal the weapon Azos. Krassel's dragon, Tempest, is defeated by Felippe, but Krassel does not return the sword. He is a boss in Chapter 4, regardless of whether the player is Mihael, Anna, or Anita. Krassel also appears in Chapter 5 as a boss, again, regardless of the player's character.
Azi Dahaka (shortened to Dahaka) can be considered the main antagonist of the game, as he is the final boss and the plot of the latter three-fifths of any of the three paths revolve around the Cult of Dahaka, who seek the magic swords in order to unlock the seal on Gehenna, where Dahaka is imprisoned. In Chapter 5, after the player defeats Krassel, their character rushes forward to face Dahaka who is going to destroy the world. In a series of two back-to-back battles, the player must defeat Dahaka to clear the game. Dahaka is a black-and-purple dragon who can use magic to transfix the player character in place. In the second boss battle with him he doubles in size and gains a larger variety of magic powers (including the ability to regenerate lost health) making him the largest and most powerful dragon in the game, and can be extremely difficult for less experienced players fighting him for the first time.
Rage/Titan is the first antagonist of the game. This dragon is the one who kills Clovis's sister Elena and starts off the events leading to the battle with Dahaka. In the prologue after it is slain by Clovis, it revives as a new bulky, multi-limbed, wingless form (Titan) and flees to the kingdom of Raxis. It hides under the castle and uses its loyal minions Ramon and Volef to terrorize the citizens. After Raimun is killed by Clovis and Volef fails it, Titan kills him and engages Clovis in combat, which after a brutal fight results in its true death. Rage is fought near the start and isn't too much of a challenge to fight, as its attacks are fairly weak, easy to dodge and it doesn't have a lot of health. Titan is considerably more difficult to beat due to his strong physical attacks and fire, but it moves slowly, making it easier to dodge its attacks. Rage/Titan is the only dragon to be fought in 2 different chapters.
Hellfire and Inferno is a two-headed dragon that lives in the deep fiery pit in the volcano, featured in the second chapter 'Berserker' but defeated by Kodel. After being defeated in battle in his own fortress, Clovis informs Kodel that he must kill the dragon, even though he had been protecting it while the 'evil' was growing inside him. Kodel is reluctant to perform the task but in order for them to live peacefully he hadn't had a choice. When encountering it he is surprised of the dragon's size, wondering how his father could face such deadly evil creatures. But with help of the 'Ice' orb, he manages to slay it. In the end, he declares that he will never do that ever again.
Arktos is an ice dragon that resides in the coldest and most frozen place, The Glacier, featured in the second chapter "The Renegade Knights" but defeated by Prince Arlen of East Raxis. Queen Celia informs her son, Prince Arlen that Londonya, Volef's son was intending to revive a dragon nearby and uniting with it to become even more unstoppable. It is then that Arlen decides to stop him but despite defeating him in battle when he reaches The Glacier, Londonya proceeds further into the area where the two knights come face-to-face with the dragon itself. Londonya declares for it to kill him so that he could become one with it, however the dragon is more interested in the magic sword, Azos, Prince Arlen has with him. This was the very dragon that killed Londonya, tossing his lifeless body into the very cold lake. Arlen is the sole witness to this incident and realizing that he was next, he had no choice but to defend himself. With help of the "Fire" orb, he manages to defeat the dragon. Arlen is surprised of his victory, meanwhile his future bride and her co-commanders look on shocked to see that he had defeated it all by himself.
Tempest is a dragon that appears in the third chapter, summoned to fight Felippe after the defeat of Zomas by Krassel. It serves as the final boss of this chapter, and uses powerful wind attacks and flight to hurt the player. Tempest is a large avian dragon that is covered in feathers which gives it a unique appearance compared to most of the other dragons. Its death signals the start of Chapter 4.
Thunder is a dragon that appears in the third chapter, summoned to fight Phillip by Vappula. It is a yellow-skinned dragon that fights using powerful bolts of electricity and the fight can be quite challenging due to the small space in which it is fought. Nevertheless, it is slain by Phillip which then leads to Halfas and Krassel executing Vappula for his failure.
Hades is a dragon that appears in the third chapter. Fought deep in the ruins by Gerome, it is a massive bipedal skeletal dragon that is powered by dark magic and attacks using powerful magic orbs that explode upon impact.
Talon is a dragon fought in Chapter 4 where it is assumed to be an alternate form of Krassel (although this is just a ruse) and is the second last dragon to be fought in the game. It is notorious for being one of the strangest dragons in the game, having a very unusual insectoid appearance vaguely resembling a rhinoceros beetle, and having hidden appendages that appear when it is injured at half health, such as an extra head inside its mouth, long claws and a tail. It also has the ability to spit out slug-style creatures to attack. The dragon shares many similarities with the G-virus boss in the video game Resident Evil 2.

Sub antagonists
Volef is one of the antagonists in the first chapter, Avenger. He is the leader of the menacing Azale knights who took over Raxis Castle six months after five years had passed on and has aligned himself with the dragon known to be hiding in a secret place. The Azale Knights were responsible for the murder of the King, Queen and Prince of Raxis and kidnapping of Princess Celia. After Clovis infiltrates the castle, defeating many of the demons patrolling there, he confronts Volef. Volef gives him the offer to surrender and become one of his henchmen but Clovis immediately refuses and goes on to defeat him. Volef is then seen again, this time with the help of the Dragon's power, he is almost unstoppable, but Clovis manages to defeat him again. Volef finds it hard to believe that he has been beaten twice. He begs the dragon to transfer its power to him once more, however the dragon kills him for his pathetic performance in killing the Dragon Valor.
Raimun is an alchemist, and of one of the antagonists in the first chapter, Avenger. He makes little appearances, as he is seen in a cutscene with the dragon, whom he is also aligned with. The dragon tells him that he senses a magic sword wielded by a Dragon Valor nearby and requests Raimun to eliminate him or else suffer the same fate as it. Raimun simply replies that he will make sure his life is forfeited. He is last seen when Clovis confronts him in his tower and is easily defeated by him. In his dying breath he pleads for the dragon to give its strength once again.
Londonya is an antagonist in the second chapter, The Renegade Knights (in Prince Arlen's storyline), after the death of King Clovis, East and West Raxis began war with one another, Londonya and his Alkemian Knights had completely taken over West Raxis. Londonya is first seen when he has the fainted Queen Celia in his arms and strikes Prince Arlen with his sword, causing the latter to fall off the balcony and into the sea. His identity is revealed after Arlen makes his way toward the execution grounds to save his mother, Celia. Londonya is the son of Volef and hates Prince Arlen and his family because it was said to believe that Arlen's father, King Clovis killed his father, not knowing that the actual killer was the dragon, Titan. Londonya intends to revive and become one with a dragon known to be located in a much more dangerous, frozen place. Over there Londonya is defeated by Arlen in one-on-one combat and is then killed by Arktos, the ice dragon, whom he had intended to be united with, though the dragon was obviously interested in the magic sword Arlen had obtained and combating him for it. In the epilogue it is mentioned that Londonya's body was never recovered.
Zomas is a minister and an antagonist in the third chapter, The Demonic Minister, (in Prince Felippe's storyline). He is first seen spectating combat between Prince Felippe and the leader of the Jirat Knight's, Vilherm with Princess Jeanne of Jirat. His intentions creep Princess Jeanne out and suddenly he takes her hostage, threatening to break her neck if Vilherm did not yield Prince Felippe's sword. Thankfully Felippe does so and intends to whip him later to retrieve it. Zomas then presents the sword, Azos to the dragon, Krassel, who then gets annoyed with him when he insists that he be metamorphosed into a dragon halfling. Krassel 'grants' his request into becoming like him and throughout the story it causes Zomas to believe that he is powerful and no one, not even Prince Felippe is able to kill him. Though he is defeated in Jirat Castle by the latter and again in his own estate in his 'dragon transformation'. Krassel considers him worthless after the battle and reveals that he didn't make him a dragon halfling. Zomas is never mentioned again.

Reception

The game received "mixed" reviews according to the review aggregation website Metacritic. Chet Barber of NextGen said, "It may not blow your socks off, but Dragon Valor is a solid title worthy of any gamer's attention." In Japan, Famitsu gave it a score of 25 out of 40.

GamePro said of the game, "With dismal features and an unexciting storyline, this is one RPG that doesn't have any valor to its name."

Notes

References

External links
 

1999 video games
Action role-playing video games
Namco games
PlayStation (console) games
PlayStation (console)-only games
Single-player video games
Video game remakes
Video game sequels
Video games about dragons
Video games developed in Japan
Video games with alternate endings
Now Production games